Máxima Apaza Millares (born October 1, 1960) is a Bolivian Indigenous activist and politician.

Since the 1980s she has been an activist against gender violence. In 1994, she was a candidate for councilor for the city of La Paz. She is the leader of the National Confederation of Women. Máxima Apaza founded the Federation of Women of El Alto.

She was elected senator, as substitute for Senator José Alberto Gonzales for the MAS (Movement to Socialism).

In July 2015 she participated in the "Foro Nueva Independencia", held in the Argentine city of Tucumán (Argentina): In the panel "With women you will have to fight: gender, politics and social movements. Traditions of struggle, political and social memory. New challenges for women" shared with the panelists Hebe de Bonafini (president of the association Mothers of the Plaza de Mayo), with Milagro Sala (activist from Jujuy, leader of the association La Tupac Amaru), and with Piedad Córdoba, moderated by the writer and activist Marta Dillon.

Máxima Apaza highlighted the decolonizing character and the gender perspective in the policies implemented by the Government led by Evo Morales. But, simultaneously, she recognized the need for a collective work and from the bases to end against the patriarchy: "If in a home we put into practice decolonization, assuming men and women the roles and functions of the home, is a contribution in this historical juncture we are living".

Apaza is an advocate for safe abortions. She has worked with Ipas for years to educate people on the preventable public health problem of unsafe abortion, which tends to greatly affect rural, indigenous women. Prior to her work in Bolivia, abortions were only accessible in cases of rape. Furthermore, women were dying as a result of unsafe abortions. Though restrictions on these abortions still exist, Apaza has contributed to women being able to have access to safe and effective abortions. Pregnant women with serious health conditions, financial limitations, and who are minors or adolescents are now among those who are able to access safe abortions. 

Apaza's stance on the reform of the penal code regarding abortions is as follows:
"We cannot turn a blind eye to this reality. With the reform of the penal code, for the first time women will be able to decide over their own bodies and that decision must be respected." 

Has collected international accessions for the exit to the sea of Bolivia: Suddenly the brothers from different countries manifest themselves: «Mar for Bolivia!». And where are the Bolivians, in the country that we visit so much the president [Evo Morales] there is a spontaneous reaction and they all say: "Mar for Bolivia!". The world is aware that Bolivia lives in an enclosure that harms it, we do not have access to the sea and that hurts our economy, harms the economy of the region. The countries realize perfectly and that is why we receive countless supports from different countries. Where the president arrives, where a Bolivian arrives, there will always be a support that says "sea for Bolivia." So we do not reach all countries, we know that they are supporting us.

References

1960 births
Living people
20th-century Bolivian politicians
20th-century Bolivian women politicians
21st-century Bolivian politicians
21st-century Bolivian women politicians
Bolivian Christian socialists
Bolivian people of Aymara descent
Bolivian senators from La Paz
Female Christian socialists
Indigenous leaders of the Americas
Indigenous people of South America
Members of the Senate of Bolivia
Movement for Socialism (Bolivia) politicians
People from La Paz
South American democratic socialists
Women human rights activists
Women members of the Senate of Bolivia